Jun Ye (born 1967) is a Chinese-American physicist at JILA, National Institute of Standards and Technology, and the University of Colorado Boulder, working primarily in the field of atomic, molecular and optical physics.

Education & career 
Ye was born in Shanghai, China, shortly after the beginning of the Cultural Revolution. His father was a naval officer and his mother an environmental scientist. He was primarily raised by his grandmother. Ye graduated with a bachelor's degree in physics from Shanghai Jiao Tong University in 1989. He then moved to the United States to commence graduate studies, completing a master's degree at the University of New Mexico under Marlan Scully in theoretical quantum optics in 1991. He also gained experience in experimental physics under John McInerney working on semiconductor lasers, and spent a summer at the Los Alamos National Laboratory.

Ye then went to the University of Colorado Boulder to begin a Ph.D. in physics. He was accepted as the last graduate student of eventual Nobel Prize laureate John L. Hall. His thesis was on high-resolution and high-sensitivity molecular spectroscopy, which he completed in 1997. He then moved to California Institute of Technology as a Milikan Postdoctoral Fellow, working under Jeff Kimble.

Ye moved back to Boulder and JILA as a JILA Associate Fellow and NIST physicist in 1999. John Hall donated most of his lab space to him. He was promoted to full Fellow in 2001 and has been there since, establishing a research program in AMO physics and precision measurement.

Research 
Ye's research focuses on ultracold atoms, ultracold molecules, and laser-based precision measurement. His group has built record breaking very precise experimental optical atomic clocks. In 2017 Ye's JILA group reported an experimental 3D quantum gas strontium optical lattice clock in which strontium-87 atoms are packed into a tiny three-dimensional (3-D) cube at 1,000 times the density of previous one-dimensional (1-D) clocks, like the 2015 JILA clock. The 3D quantum gas strontium optical lattice clock uses an unusual state of matter called a degenerate Fermi gas (a quantum gas for Fermi particles).

Such clocks could potentially be used for research into variations in the Earth's gravitational field, searching for particles of dark matter, performing quantum simulations of many-body physics, and investigating the fundamental nature of light and matter. He also conducts research on strontium for experiments in quantum information science (collaborating with Mikhail Lukin, Ana Maria Rey, Peter Zoller, and others).

Ye's other research focuses include ultrastable lasers (which are essential for the mechanics of his atomic clock), frequency combs, and molecular spectroscopy. In 2012, his group successfully constructed the world's stablest laser. He pioneered the development of direct frequency comb spectroscopy, and also collaborates with Eric Cornell on an experiment aiming to measure the electric dipole moment of the electron using trapped ions.

Popularization of science 
Ye appeared in the 2018 Netflix documentary The Most Unknown on scientific research directed by Ian Cheney.

Honors and awards
Ye has received numerous awards in the field of science, particularly AMO physics. He was elected a Fellow of the American Physical Society and a Fellow of the Optical Society of America. He won the Adolph Lomb Medal of OSA in 1999 and the Arthur S. Flemming Award for outstanding federal employees in 2005, the Friedrich Wilhem Bessel Research Award from Germany and the William F. Meggers Award of the Optical Society of America in 2006, and the Carl Zeiss Research Award and the I. I. Rabi Prize in AMO Physics from the APS in 2007. He has won three Gold Medals from the US Department of Commerce: for frequency combs (2001), ultracold molecules (2011), and atomic clocks (2014). He won the Samuel Wesley Stratton Award in 2006 and Jacob Rabinow applied research award in 2017 from NIST. In 2011 he was elected to the National Academy of Sciences, and also named a Frew Fellow from the Australian Academy of Science.  In 2015, President Obama selected Jun Ye to receive a Presidential Rank Award for “sustained extraordinary accomplishment”, citing his work advancing "the frontier of light-matter interaction and focusing on precision measurement, quantum physics and ultracold matter, optical frequency metrology, and ultrafast science." In 2017, Ye was elected as a foreign member of the Chinese Academy of Sciences. Jun Ye was the recipient of the 2019 Norman F. Ramsey Prize in Atomic, Molecular and Optical Physics, and in Precision Tests of Fundamental Laws and Symmetries for his ground-breaking contributions to precision measurements and the quantum control of atomic and molecular systems, including atomic clocks. He was awarded the 2022 Breakthrough Prize in Fundamental Physics.

He is one of the most highly cited researchers in experimental atomic physics in the world, having according to Google Scholar a h-index of 120 and being regularly named as a Thomson-Reuters (ISI) Highly Cited Researcher.

References

1967 births
Living people
21st-century American physicists
Members of the United States National Academy of Sciences
Scientists from Shanghai
Foreign members of the Chinese Academy of Sciences
Chinese emigrants to the United States
Shanghai Jiao Tong University alumni
University of New Mexico alumni
University of Colorado Boulder alumni
University of Colorado Boulder faculty
National Institute of Standards and Technology
Fellows of the American Physical Society